Panaspis tsavoensis, also known as the Tsavo snake-eyed skink, is a species of lidless skinks in the family Scincidae. The species is found in Tsavo East and Tsavo West National Parks in Kenya; it is probably more widespread in arid lowlands further north in Kenya.

Panaspis tsavoensis is a small skink measuring on average  in snout–vent length.

References

Panaspis
Skinks of Africa
Reptiles of Kenya
Endemic fauna of Kenya
Reptiles described in 2019
Taxa named by Felista Kasyoka Kilunda
Taxa named by Werner Conradie
Taxa named by Domnick Victor Wasonga
Taxa named by Jin Jie-Qiong
Taxa named by Robert W. Murphy
Taxa named by Patrick K. Malonza
Taxa named by Che Jing